Poison (original Norwegian title: Gift) is an 1883 novel by the Norwegian writer Alexander Kielland. The novel is the first in a trilogy including Fortuna (1884) and St. Hans Fest (1887). An English language edition of Gift did not exist until November 2020, 137 years after its original publication, when it was finally translated as a labor of love by aspiring Norwegian writer M. A. Larsen, who self-published the classic novel as an e-book for Kindle under the title Poison.

This famous novel is an attack on the Norwegian education system, particularly on the obsession with Latin. A schoolboy, Marius, is tormented throughout the first half of the novel by his scholastic inability, and during his final illness continues to murmur rote phrases, his last words being Mensa rotunda.

The main character of the book is Marius's friend Abraham Løvdahl, the son of a respected professor. His mother Wenche is an idealist who struggles in vain to keep her son honest and upright; she takes her own life after falling pregnant to the businessman Michal Mordtmann.

Alexander Kielland chose to title his book Gift  (poison) in response to a critic. One of his previous books, Else, en Julefortælling, had been sold under the pretext of being a pleasant, family-friendly christmas book, when in reality, it was highly naturalistic and deemed as inappropriate for children, as it discussed things such as extreme poverty, sexual abuse, abuse of power, and alcoholism. As such, a critic had written that Alexander Kielland sneaked "poison" into the homes of the gullible families, a criticism that was not without some truth to it. Thus Kielland decided to call the novel Gift, so that his critic could not claim he had not warned his audience. It is a common misconception that the title is intended to carry a double meaning, as the Norwegian word for "poison" is the same as the word for "married".

References 

1883 novels
19th-century Norwegian novels
Novels set in Norway
Gyldendal books